Stratification in water is the separation of a body of water in layers by density. It occurs in all water bodies where there is density variation. Stratification is a barrier to the mixing of water, which affects the exchange of heat, carbon, oxygen and nutrients. Wind-driven upwelling and downwelling of open water can induce mixing of different layers through the stratification, and cause the rise of denser cold, nutrient-rich, or saline water and the sinking of lighter warm or fresher water, respectively. Layers are based on water density: denser water remains below less dense water in stable stratification in the absence of forced mixing.

Stratification occurs in several kinds of water bodies, such as oceans, lakes, estuaries, flooded caves, aquifers and some rivers.

Mechanism
The dependence on pressure is not significant, since water is almost perfectly incompressible. An increase in the temperature of the water above 4 °C causes expansion and the density will decrease. A increase in salinity , the mass of dissolved solids, induces an increase in density. Increasing the salinity will increase the density.

A pycnocline is a layer in a body of water where the change in density is relatively large compared to that of other layers in the ocean. The thickness of the thermocline is not constant everywhere and depends on a variety of variables. Between 1960 and 2018, upper ocean stratification increased between 0.7-1.2% per decade. This means that the differences in density of the layers in the oceans increase, leading to larger mixing barriers and other effects. Density is the decisive factor in stratification. It is possible for a combination of temperature and salinity to result in a density that is less or more than the effect of either one in isolation, so it can happen that a layer of warmer saline water is layered between a colder fresher surface layer and a colder more saline deeper layer.

Just like the pycnocline defines the layer with a large change in density with depth, similar layers can be defined for a large change in temperature, the thermocline, and salinity, the halocline. Since the density depends on both the temperature and the salinity, the pycno-, thermo-, and halocline have a similar shape.

Mixing

By water body

Oceans

Estuaries 

 Estuary#Classification based on water circulation
 Estuarine water circulation#Vertical mixing and stratification

Lakes 

Lake stratification is the tendency of lakes to form separate and distinct thermal layers during warm weather, and sometimes when frozen over. Typically stratified lakes show three distinct layers, the epilimnion comprising the top warm layer, the thermocline (or metalimnion): the middle layer, which may change depth throughout the day, and the colder hypolimnion extending to the floor of the lake.

The thermal stratification of lakes refers to a change in the temperature at different depths in the lake, and is due to the density of water varying with temperature. Cold water is denser than warm water and the epilimnion generally consists of water that is not as dense as the water in the hypolimnion. However, the temperature of maximum density for freshwater is 4 °C. In temperate regions where lake water warms up and cools through the seasons, a cyclical pattern of overturn occurs that is repeated from year to year as the cold dense water at the top of the lake sinks (see stable and unstable stratification). For example, in dimictic lakes the lake water turns over during the spring and the fall. This process occurs more slowly in deeper water and as a result, a thermal bar may form. If the stratification of water lasts for extended periods, the lake is meromictic.

In shallow lakes, stratification into epilimnion, metalimnion, and hypolimnion often does not occur, as wind or cooling causes regular mixing throughout the year. These lakes are called polymictic. There is not a fixed depth that separates polymictic and stratifying lakes, as apart from depth, this is also influenced by turbidity, lake surface area, and climate.
The lake mixing regime (e.g. polymictic, dimictic, meromictic) describes the yearly patterns of lake stratification that occur in most years. However, short-term events can influence lake stratification as well. Heat waves can cause periods of stratification in otherwise mixed, shallow lakes, while mixing events, such as storms or large river discharge, can break down stratification. Recent research suggests that seasonally ice-covered dimictic lakes may be described as "cryostratified" or "cryomictic" according to their wintertime stratification regimes. Cryostratified lakes exhibit inverse stratification near the ice surface and have depth-averaged temperatures near 4 °C, while cryomictic lakes have no under-ice thermocline and have depth-averaged winter temperatures closer to 0 °C.

Flooded caves

Aquifers

References

Hydrology